Kadir Yahaya (born in Singapore) is a Singaporean retired footballer.

In February 2010, Kadir became the coach of the Singapore 2010 Youth Olympics football team after former coach David Sivalingam died of a heart attack in November 2009. The team went on to win the bronze medal in the Youth Olympics.

References

External links

Singaporean football managers
Living people
1968 births
Singaporean footballers
Singapore international footballers
Geylang International FC players
Association football defenders